John Winfred "Buster" Cupit (born March 22, 1927) is an American professional golfer.

Cupit was born in Missouri and grew up in Longview, Texas. His younger brother, Jacky Cupit, won four PGA Tour events.

Cupit worked primarily as a club pro but also played on the PGA Tour. In 1961, he almost won in consecutive tournaments only to finish second in both. At the St. Paul Open, he lost by one stroke to Don January after leading by two strokes after 54 holes. A week later, he trailed his brother Jacky by one stroke entering the final round of the Canadian Open, but shot 75 to finish in a tie for second, five strokes behind his brother. His last full season on the PGA Tour came in 1966 when he started 16 events. His best finish in a major was a T-8 at the 1958 PGA Championship.

Cupit owns and operates the Longview Country Club in Longview, Texas.

Professional wins
1958 Oklahoma Open
1965 Oklahoma Open

References

American male golfers
PGA Tour golfers
Golfers from Missouri
Golfers from Texas
People from Longview, Texas
1927 births
Living people